HD 211575 is a star in the constellation Aquarius in between "Gamma Aquarii", "Pi Aquarii" and "Sadalmelik". It is a member of the corona of the Ursa Major moving group.

References

F-type main-sequence stars
Aquarius (constellation)
Durchmusterung objects
211575
110091
8507
Ursa Major Moving Group